Macleod Nicol (born 18 October 1958) is a British luger. He competed in the men's singles event at the 1988 Winter Olympics.

References

External links
 

1958 births
Living people
British male lugers
Olympic lugers of Great Britain
Lugers at the 1988 Winter Olympics
Sportspeople from London